Hamad, Hammad, or Al Hamad / Al-Hamad is an Arabic given name and surname, and may refer to:

Sheikh Hamad
Sheikh Hamad may refer to prince of Arab nation or just an honorary title:
Qatar
Sheikh Hamad bin Khalifa Al Thani, Ruler of Qatar (1995–2013)
Sheikh Hamad bin Abdullah Al Thani
Sheikh Hamad bin Abdullah Al Thani
Sheikh Hamad bin Jabor bin Jassim Al Thani
Sheikh Hamad bin Jassim bin Jaber Al Thani
Sheikh Hamad bin Jassim bin Hamad Al Thani
Sheikh Hamad bin Khalid Al Thani
Sheikh Hamad bin Suhaim Al Thani
Sheikh Hamad bin Thamer Al Thani

Bahrain
Hamad ibn Isa Al Khalifa (1872–1942), Ruler of Bahrain
Hamad ibn Isa Al Khalifah, Ruler of Bahrain

UAE
Sheikh Hamad bin Mohammed Al Sharqi, Ruler of Fujairah

Oman
Sayyed Hamad bin Said (died 1803), Sultan of Oman
Sayyed Hamad bin Thuwaini of Zanzibar (1857–1896), Sultan (ruler) of Zanzibar

Other people with the given name
Hamad Al Abedy (born 1991), Qatari football player 
Hamad Aladwani, Kuwaiti paralympic athlete sprinter
Hamad Amar (born 1964), Poopi Druze politician and Member of Knesset
Hamad Al-Asmar (born 1987), Jordanian football player
Hamad Al Enezi (born 1986), Kuwaiti football player 
Hamad Al-Eissa (born 1982), Saudi Arabian football player
Hamad Al Fardan (born 1987), Bahraini racing driver
Hamad Ganayem (born 1987), Israeli Arab football player
Hamad Al Harbi, Kuwaiti football player 
Hamad Al-Jassir (1907–2000), Saudi Arabian journalist and historian
Hamad Khalaily (born 1928), Israeli-Arab politician and Member of the Knesset 
Hamad Masauni (born 1973), Tanzanian politician and member of Parliament
Hamad Rashid Mohamed (born 1950), Tanzanian politician and Member of Parliament
Hamad Al-Montashari (born 1982), Saudi footballer
Hamad al-Naqi (born c. 1986), Kuwaiti blogger imprisoned for his writings  
Hamad Nazzal, Arab American journalist
Hamad Ndikumana (1978–2017), Rwandan football player
Hamad Abu Rabia (1929–1981), Bedouin Israeli politician and Member of Knesset
Hamad Al-Sagoor (born 1979), Saudi Arabian football player
Hamad Al Tayyar (born 1982), Kuwaiti football player
Hamad bin Thamer Al Thani, journalist, director general of the Al Jazeera Media Network

Other people with the middle name
Najm Hamad Al Ahmad (born 1969), Syrian jurist and justice minister

Other people with the surname
Abdérazak Hamad (born 1975), Algerian handball player
Adnan Hamad (born 1961), Iraqi international football player
Ali Ahmed Ali Hamad, Bahraini alleged Al Qaeda commander
Bahiya Al-Hamad (born 1992), Qatari rifle shooter
Essam Hamad (born 1973), Iraqi football player
Fathi Hamad (born 1961), Palestinian political leader in Hamas
Ghazi Hamad (born 1964), Palestinian politician and administrator
Hamad Ali Hamad (born 1964), Tanzanian politician and Member of Parliament
Hassan Ahmed Hamad, Egyptian athlete
Ibrahim Mahmoud Hamad, Sudanese politician
Jiloan Hamad (born 1990), Swedish football player
Karam Alhamad (born 1990), Syrian journalist and human rights activist
Khalil Abou Hamad (1936–1992), Lebanese lawyer and politician
Mehad Hamad, Emirati artist
Mesaad Al-Hamad (born 1986), Qatari football player
Rashid Hamad (born 1987), Qatari sport shooter
Salameh Hammad (born 1944), Jordanian politician
Sam Hamad (born 1958), Canadian politician
Seif Sharif Hamad (1943–2021), Zanzibari politician
Turki al-Hamad (born 1952), Saudi Arabian political analyst, journalist, and novelist

See also
Hamad (disambiguation)